Gillingham Football Club is an English professional association football club based in Gillingham, Kent, playing in League One, the third level of the English football league system, as of the 2019–20 season. The club was formed in 1893 as New Brompton F.C., a name which was retained until 1913, and has played home matches at Priestfield Stadium throughout its history. The club joined the Football League in 1920, was voted out of the league in favour of Ipswich Town at the end of the 1937–38 season, but returned to the league 12 years later after it was expanded from 88 to 92 clubs. Between 2000 and 2005, Gillingham played in the second tier of the English league for the only time in the club's history, achieving a highest league finish of eleventh place in 2002–03.

The record for most games played for the club is held by Ron Hillyard, who made 655 appearances between 1974 and 1991. Brian Yeo is the club's record goalscorer, scoring 149 goals during his Gillingham career.  Andrew Crofts holds the record for the most international caps gained as a Gillingham player, having made 12 appearances for Wales.  The highest transfer fee ever paid by the club is the £600,000 paid to Reading for Carl Asaba in 1998, and the highest fee received is the £1,500,000 paid by Manchester City for Robert Taylor in 1999.  The highest attendance recorded at Priestfield was 23,002 for the visit of Queens Park Rangers in 1948.  The club holds one Football League record, having conceded the fewest goals in a 46-match season, when the team conceded only 20 goals during the 1995–96 season.

All figures are correct as of 2022.

Honours and achievements

Gillingham have won two major honours in English football; first the Football League Fourth Division title in the 1963–64 season and then the Football League Two title in the 2012–13 season. The club has also achieved promotion on four other occasions, most recently in the 2008–09 season, when a 1–0 victory over Shrewsbury Town in the 2009 Football League Two play-off final secured a return to League One following relegation the previous season.

Gillingham's only previous victory at Wembley Stadium came in the 1999–2000 season, when a 3–2 victory over Wigan Athletic in the Second Division play-off final clinched promotion to the second tier of English football for the first time in Gillingham's history. Between 1938 and 1950, when the club played outside the Football League, Gillingham won the Southern Football League championship on two occasions and the Kent League once.

The Football League
Second Division (level 3):
 Promotion (1): 1999–2000
Third Division / Fourth Division / Football League Two (level 4):
Winners (2): 1963–64, 2012–13
Promotion (3): 1973–74, 1995–96, 2008–09

Other honours

Southern League:
Division One champions (2): 1946–47, 1948–49
Division Two champions (1): 1894–95
Southern League Cup winners (1): 1946–47
Kent League:
Champions (1): 1945–46
Kent League Cup winners (1): 1945–46

National cup competitions
FA Cup:
Quarter finalists: 1999–2000
League Cup:
Fourth round (round of 16): 1963–64, 1996–97 and 2022-23

Player records

Age
Youngest first team player: Luke Freeman, 15 years 233 days (against Barnet, 10 November 2007).
Oldest first team player: Andy Hessenthaler, 40 years 115 days (against Port Vale, 10 December 2005).
Oldest first team debutant: John Gorman, 37 years 39 days (against Oxford United, 24 September 1986).

Appearances
All competitive peacetime first team matches are included. Statistics correct as of the end of the 2019–20 season.  Appearances as substitute are in brackets.  Players who played for the club prior to 1920 or between 1938 and 1950, when the club played in the Southern League and Kent League rather than the Football League, have appearances in those competitions included in their totals.

a. Includes Football League, Southern League and Kent League
b. Includes Football League Cup, Southern League Cup and Kent League Cup

Goalscorers

Most goals in a season: Hughie Russell, 42 goals (including 33 Southern League goals) in the 1946–47 season.
Most goals in a season during Football League membership: Brian Yeo, 32 goals (including 31 League goals) in the 1973–74 season.
Most Football League goals in a season:
Brian Yeo, 31 goals in Division Four in the 1973–74 season.
Ernie Morgan, 31 goals in Division Three South in the 1954–55 season.
Most goals in a Football League match: 6, Fred Cheesmur (against Merthyr Town, 26 April 1930).
Most goals in any match: 9, Hughie Russell (against Gloucester City, Southern League, 9 November 1946).
Fastest hat-trick: Jimmy Scarth, three goals in two minutes and 30 seconds (against Leyton Orient, 1 November 1952). At the time this was the fastest hat-trick in Football League history, a record which lasted until 2004.

Top goalscorers
All competitive first team matches are included.  Appearances, including those as substitute, are in brackets.  Players who played for the club prior to 1920 or between 1938 and 1950, when the club played in the Southern League and Kent League rather than the Football League, have goals in those competitions included in their totals.

a. Includes Football League, Southern League and Kent League
b. Includes Football League Cup, Southern League Cup and Kent League Cup

International caps

First capped player: Damien Richardson for Republic of Ireland on 6 June 1973
Most international caps while a Gillingham player: Andrew Crofts, 12 for Wales
First Gillingham player to appear in the World Cup finals: Brent Sancho, for Trinidad and Tobago against Sweden on 10 June 2006

Transfer fees

Record transfer fees paid

Record transfer fees received

Some media sources claimed that the transfer fee paid by Southampton for Paulo Gazzaniga in 2012 was higher than that paid for Taylor, but the fee was not officially disclosed by either club.

Managerial records

First manager: William Ironside Groombridge (appointed secretary-manager in 1896)
Longest serving manager: Archie Clark, managed the club from 1939 until 1957

Club records

Goals
Most Football League goals scored in a season: 90 in 46 matches, Division Four, 1973–74.
Fewest Football League goals scored in a season: 34 in 42 matches, Division Three, 1920–21.
Most Football League goals conceded in a season: 101 in 46 matches, Division Three South, 1950–51.
Fewest Football League goals conceded in a season: 20 in 46 matches, Division Three, 1995–96, a league record for a 46-game season.
Most league goals scored in a season at any level: 111 in 20 matches, Kent League, 1945–46.
Fewest league goals scored in a season at any level: 20 in 34 matches, Southern League Division One, 1905–06.

Points
Most points in a Football League season:
Two points for a win: 62 in 46 games, Division Four, 1973–74.
Three points for a win: 85 in 46 games, Division Two, 1999–2000.
Fewest points in a Football League season:
Two points for a win: 26 in 44 games, Division Three South, 1937–38.
Three points for a win: 40 in 42 games, Division Three, 1992–93, and 40 in 46 games, Division Three, 1988–89.
Most points in a season at any level:
Two points for a win: 64 in 44 games, Southern League, 1938–39.
Fewest points in a season at any level:
Two points for a win: 19 in 28 games, Southern League Division One, 1900–01.

Matches

Firsts
First match: New Brompton 1–5 Woolwich Arsenal reserves, friendly, 2 September 1893
First FA Cup match: Ilford 6–3 New Brompton, first qualifying round, 14 October 1893
First Southern League match: Sheppey United 0–6 New Brompton, Division Two, 15 September 1894
First Football League match: Gillingham 1–1 Southampton, Division Three South, 28 August 1920
First Football League Cup match: Gillingham 1–1 Preston North End, second round, 19 October 1960

Record wins
Record Football League win: 10–0 against Chesterfield in Division Three, 5 September 1987.
Record FA Cup win: 10–1 against Gorleston, first round, 16 November 1957.
Record win in any match: 12–1 against Gloucester City in the Southern League, 9 November 1946.

Record defeat
Record Football League defeat: 0–8 against Luton Town in Division Three South, 13 April 1929
Record FA Cup defeat: 3–9 against Sutton United, fourth qualifying round, 3 November 1945.

Attendances
Highest home attendance: 23,002 against Queens Park Rangers, FA Cup third round, 10 January 1948.
Highest Football League attendance: 20,128 against Millwall, Division Three South, 2 September 1950.

Notes
A.  Promoted via the play-off system after finishing in third place.

B.  Promoted automatically by finishing in second place on both occasions.

C.  Promoted via the play-off system after finishing in fifth place.

D.  Cascarino is placed higher than Gibbs, and Morgan higher than Westwood, as they reached their goals totals in fewer matches.

E.  The club has in the past claimed that goalkeeper Freddie Fox made his one appearance for England in 1925 while registered with Gillingham.  It is possible that he was still with Gillingham when the team selection was announced, but he left the club to join Millwall nearly a month before the match actually took place.

F.  This was the first match for the club's first team, but it was preceded by the first match for the club's reserve team, which occurred earlier on the same day.

References
General

Specific

Records and Statistics
Gillingham